Tilley  may refer to:

Places
 Tilley, Alberta, a village in Canada
 Tilley, New Brunswick, Canada
 Tilley, Shropshire, a village in England
 Tilley, Western Australia, a small railway siding and future junction

Other uses
 Tilley (surname), people with the surname Tilley
 Tilley's, a café in Canberra, Australia
 Tilley Endurables, a Canadian hat company.
Tilley Swamp, South Australia, a locality

See also
 Tilley lamp, a kerosene lamp